A Bond girl is a character who is a love interest, female companion or (occasionally) an adversary of James Bond in a novel, film, or video game. Bond girls occasionally have names that are double entendres or puns, such as Pussy Galore, Plenty O'Toole, Holly Goodhead, or Xenia Onatopp. The female leads in the films, such as Ursula Andress, Honor Blackman, or Eva Green, can also be referred to as "Bond girls". The term Bond girl may also be considered as an anachronism, with some female cast members in the films preferring the designation Bond woman.

In novels

Nearly all of Ian Fleming's Bond novels and short stories include one or more female characters who can be said to qualify as Bond girls, most of whom have been adapted for the screen. While Fleming's Bond girls have some individual traits (at least in their literary forms), they also have a great many characteristics in common. One of these is age: The typical Bond girl is in her early to mid-twenties, roughly ten years younger than Bond, who seems to be perennially in his mid-thirties. Examples include Solitaire (25), Tatiana Romanova (24), Vivienne "Viv" Michel (23), and Kissy Suzuki (23). The youngest Bond girl (though she and Bond do not sleep together) may be Gala Brand; she is named for the cruiser in which her father is serving at the time of her birth. Bond's youngest sexual partner in the books is Mariko Ichiban, an 18-year-old masseuse in You Only Live Twice. The eldest Bond girls are Pussy Galore, who Bond speculates is in her early 30s, and 29-year-old Domino Vitali.

Bond girls conform to a fairly well-defined standard of beauty. They possess splendid figures and tend to dress in a slightly masculine, assertive fashion, wear little jewellery—and that in a masculine cut—wide leather belts, and square-toed leather shoes. (There is some variation in dress, though: Bond girls have made their initial appearances in evening wear, in bra and panties and, on occasion, naked.) Most are white; they often sport light though noticeable suntans (although a few, such as Solitaire, Tatiana Romanova, and Pussy Galore, are not only tanless but remarkably pale), and they generally use little or no makeup and no nail polish, also wearing their nails short. Their hair may be any colour, though they typically wear it in a natural or casual cut that falls heavily to their shoulders. Their features, especially their eyes and mouths, are often widely spaced (e.g. Vesper Lynd, Gala Brand, Tiffany Case, Tatiana Romanova, Honey Ryder, Viv Michel, Mary Goodnight). Their eyes are usually blue (e.g. Vesper Lynd, Gala Brand, Tatiana Romanova, Honey Ryder, Tracy Bond, Mary Goodnight), and sometimes this is true to an unusual and striking degree: Tiffany Case's eyes are chatoyant, varying with the light from grey to grey-blue, while Pussy Galore has deep violet eyes, the only truly violet eyes that Bond had ever seen. The first description of a Bond girl, Casino Royale's Vesper Lynd, is almost a template for the typical dress as well as the general appearance of later Bond girls; she sports nearly all of the features discussed above. In contrast, Dominetta "Domino" Vitali arguably departs to the greatest degree from the template, dressing in white leather doeskin sandals, appearing more tanned, sporting a soft Brigitte Bardot haircut, and giving no indication of widely spaced features. (The departure may be due to the unusual circumstances behind the writing of the novel Thunderball, in which Domino appears.) Even Domino, however, wears rather masculine jewellery.

The best-known characteristic of Bond girls, apart from their uniform beauty, is their pattern of sexually suggestive names, such as Pussy Galore. Names with less obvious meanings are sometimes explained in the novels. While Solitaire's real name is Simone Latrelle, she is known as Solitaire because she excludes men from her life; Gala Brand, as noted above, is named for her father's cruiser, HMS Galatea; and Tiffany Case received her name from her father, who was so angry that she was not a boy that he gave her mother a thousand dollars and a compact from Tiffany's and then walked out on her. Fleming's penchant for double-entendre names began with the first Bond novel Casino Royale. Conjecture is widespread that the name of the Bond girl in that novel, "Vesper Lynd," was intended to be a pun on "West Berlin," signifying Vesper's divided loyalties as a double agent under Soviet control. Several Bond girls, however, have normal names (e.g. Mary Ann Russell, Judy Havelock, Viv Michel, Tracy Bond (née Teresa Draco, aka Contessa Teresa di Vicenzo).

Most Bond girls are apparently (and sometimes expressly) sexually experienced by the time they meet Bond. Quite often those previous experiences have not been positive, and many Bond girls have had sexual violence inflicted on them in the past, causing them to feel alienated from all men—until Bond comes along. Tiffany Case was gang-raped as a teenager; Honey Ryder was beaten and raped as a teenager by a drunken acquaintance. Pussy Galore was sexually abused at age 12 by her uncle. While there is no such clear-cut trauma in Solitaire's early life, there are suggestions that she, too, avoids men because of their unwanted sexual advances in her past. Kissy Suzuki reports to Bond that during her brief career in Hollywood, when she was 17, "They thought that because I am Japanese I am some sort of an animal and that my body is for everyone." The implication is often that these violent episodes have turned these Bond girls against men, though upon encountering Bond they overcome their earlier antipathy and sleep with him not only willingly but eagerly. The cliché reaches an extreme level in Goldfinger, where Pussy Galore is portrayed as a lesbian when she first meets Bond, but at the end of the novel she sleeps with him. When, in bed, he says to her, "They told me you only liked women," she replies, "I never met a man before."

In Fleming's novels, many Bond girls have some sort of independent job or even career, often one that was considered inappropriate for women in the 1950s. Lynd, Brand, Tatiana Romanova, Mary Ann Russell, and Mary Goodnight are in intelligence or law-enforcement work. Those who are criminals, such as Case and Galore, tend to be similarly independent-minded in how they approach their work—the latter even running her own syndicate. Even those Bond girls who have more conventional or glamorous jobs show themselves to be invested in having an independent outlook on life. While the Bond girls are clearly intended as sex objects, they are nevertheless portrayed in the novels as having a high degree of independence; this is also frequently (but not always) the case in the films.

Most of the novels focus on one particular romance, as some of them do not begin until well into the novel (Casino Royale is a good example). However, several exceptions have been made: In Goldfinger, the Masterton sisters are considered Bond girls (although Tilly is supposedly a lesbian), and after their deaths, Pussy Galore (also supposedly a lesbian) becomes the primary Bond girl. In Thunderball, Bond romances first Patricia Fearing, then later Domino Vitali. In On Her Majesty's Secret Service, Bond enters into a relationship and an eventual marriage with Teresa "Tracy" di Vicenzo, and sleeps with Ruby Windsor, a patient he meets in Blofeld's hideout while posing as a genealogist. In You Only Live Twice, Bond mainly has a relationship with Kissy Suzuki, but also romances Mariko Ichiban, as well as another girl.

Several Bond girls have obvious signs of inner turmoil (Vesper Lynd or Vivienne Michel), and others have traumatic pasts. Most Bond girls whose characters are allowed to develop in the course of the story are flawed, and several have unhappy sexual backgrounds (Ryder, Galore, Case, Michel, and Suzuki, among others).

Inspiration
The inspiration for all of Fleming's Bond girls may be his onetime lover Muriel Wright, who according to The Times:

Wright was 26 and "exceptionally beautiful" when she and Fleming met in 1935. A talented rider, skier, and polo player, Wright was independently wealthy and a model. She was devoted to Fleming, despite his repeated unfaithfulness. She died in an air raid in 1944, devastating Fleming, who called Wright "too good to be true".

In film

Ursula Andress (as Honey Ryder) in Dr. No (1962) is widely regarded as the first Bond girl, although she was preceded by both Eunice Gayson as Sylvia Trench and Zena Marshall as Miss Taro in the same film. Goldfinger (1964), the third, established the Bond girl as regularly appearing in Bond films.

There is no set rule on what kind of person a Bond girl will be or what role she will play. She may be an ally or an enemy of Bond, pivotal to the mission or simply there for her looks. There are female characters such as Judi Dench's M, Camille Montes, a Bolivian intelligence agent who teams up with Bond in Quantum of Solace, and Bibi Dahl in For Your Eyes Only, who are not romantic interests of Bond, and hence may not be considered Bond girls. It has been argued that M's pivotal role in the plot of Skyfall qualifies her as a Bond girl or Bond woman.

There have been many attempts to break down the numerous Bond girls into a top 10 list for the entire series; characters who often appear in these lists include Anya Amasova (from The Spy Who Loved Me, portrayed by Barbara Bach); Pussy Galore (from Goldfinger, portrayed by Honor Blackman); Contessa Teresa di Vicenzo (from On Her Majesty's Secret Service, portrayed by Diana Rigg); and often ranked Number 1 on the list, Honey Ryder (from Dr. No, portrayed by Ursula Andress). Entertainment Weekly put "Bond bathing suits" on its 2009 end-of-the-decade "best-of" list, saying, "And you thought spies were supposed to be inconspicuous! Halle Berry's orange bikini in Die Another Day (2002) and Daniel Craig's supersnug powder blue trunks in Casino Royale (2006) suggest that neither 007 star can keep a secret."

Monica Bellucci in Spectre became the oldest Bond girl at the age of 50, although she stated that she does not consider herself to be a "Bond girl", but a "Bond woman".

Roles and impact
Roald Dahl said that when writing the script for You Only Live Twice, he was advised to use three Bond girls: The first should die "preferably in Bond's arms" early, the second a villain whom Bond seduces before she dies in an unusual and gory way midway, and the third survives to the end of the film. In several, the Bond girl is revealed, after her tryst with Bond, to be a villainess. Examples are Fatima Blush (Barbara Carrera) in Never Say Never Again (1983), Elektra King (Sophie Marceau) in The World Is Not Enough (1999), and Miranda Frost (Rosamund Pike) in Die Another Day (2002). The Dalton films of the 1980s introduced the "Bond woman", who is equal to and challenges Bond, but he remains the heterosexual hero; they are depicted with Dalton and later Bonds and their cars and gadgets, implying that all are possessions that Bond can use and dispose.

As of 2013, there had been only two films in which James Bond falls in love with the Bond girl. The first was On Her Majesty's Secret Service (1969), in which Countess Tracy di Vicenzo (Diana Rigg) marries Bond but is shot dead by Irma Bunt and Ernst Stavro Blofeld at the story's end. The second was Vesper Lynd (Eva Green) in Casino Royale (2006). Bond confesses his love to her and resigns from MI6 so that they can have a normal life together. He later learns that she had been a double agent working for his enemies. The enemy organisation Quantum had kidnapped her former lover and had been blackmailing her to secure her co-operation. She ends up actually falling in love with Bond, but dies, as Quantum is closing in on her, by drowning in a lift in a building under renovation in Venice.

With the exception of these two doomed Bond girls, it is never explained why Bond's love interest in one film is gone by the next, and is never mentioned or even alluded to again. This is not always the case in the novels, which do sometimes make references to the Bond girls who have appeared in previous books. Tiffany Case and Honey Ryder are revealed to have married other men (in From Russia With Love and The Man With the Golden Gun respectively), and in Doctor No, Bond briefly wonders about Solitaire. In John Gardner's novels continuing the franchise Bond girls begin to appear in more than one book, often picking up their relationships with Bond from before, and in one case continuing a romance through two consecutive titles. In Licence Renewed it is specifically noted in an epilogue that Bond and Lavender Peacock stopped seeing each other after a brief romance, but Sukie Tempesta (Nobody Lives for Ever), Beatrice Maria da Ricci (Win, Lose or Die), and Fredericka von Grüsse (Never Send Flowers) all make return appearances in later books. Anthony Horowitz's Trigger Mortis picks up two weeks after the events in Goldfinger with Bond continuing his relationship with Pussy Galore. A unique case is Mary Goodnight, who appears in the novels On Her Majesty's Secret Service and You Only Live Twice as Bond's secretary, before becoming a full-fledged Bond girl in The Man With the Golden Gun.

Effect on career
The role of a Bond girl, as it has evolved in the films, is typically a high-profile part that can sometimes give a major boost to the career of unestablished actresses, although a number of Bond girls were well-established beforehand. For instance, Diana Rigg and Honor Blackman were both cast as Bond girls after they had already become stars in the United Kingdom for their roles in the television series The Avengers. In addition, Halle Berry won an Academy Award in 2002—the award was presented to her while she was filming Die Another Day. Teri Hatcher was already known for her role as Lois Lane in the television series Lois & Clark: The New Adventures of Superman before she was cast in Tomorrow Never Dies. A few years after playing a Bond girl, she became one of the most highly paid actresses on television, starring in Desperate Housewives. Jane Seymour was an unknown when she was cast in Live and Let Die (the opening credits read "Introducing Jane Seymour"), later won an Emmy Award for playing Maria Callas in a TV movie and then became a household name playing the title role in her TV series Dr. Quinn, Medicine Woman. Kim Basinger has had perhaps the most successful post-Bond career. After her breakout role in Never Say Never Again, she went on to win an Academy Award for her performance in L.A. Confidential and to star in such notable films as 9½ Weeks, Batman, and 8 Mile.

Broccoli's original choice for the role of Domino Derval was Julie Christie following her performance in Billy Liar in 1963. It seems he was disappointed when he met her so instead he considered Raquel Welch after seeing her on the cover of the October 1964 issue of Life magazine. Welch, however, was hired by Richard Zanuck of 20th Century Fox to appear in the film Fantastic Voyage the same year instead. French actress Claudine Auger was ultimately cast in the role. Thunderball launched Auger into a successful European film career but did little for her in the United States.

At one time, it was said that appearing as a Bond girl would damage an actress's career. Lois Chiles is often cited as a case in point, even though her career did not suffer because of her portrayal of Holly Goodhead, but rather because, after she lost her younger brother to non-Hodgkin lymphoma, she decided to take a three-year break from acting, from which her career never recovered. Casting for the female lead in Casino Royale (2006) was hindered by potential actresses' concerns about the effect that playing the role might have on their careers. At that point, some thought that the Bond series had become stale and would therefore be a less desirable vehicle for young actresses. Nevertheless, the up-and-coming actress Eva Green agreed to play the role of Vesper Lynd, and showed those fears to be unfounded when she won BAFTA's Rising Star Award for her performance. Rosamund Pike, who made her feature film debut as Miranda Frost in Die Another Day (2002), went on to earn an Academy Award nomination for Gone Girl.

Multiple appearances
Prior to the series being rebooted in 2006 with Casino Royale, Sylvia Trench was the only Bond girl character to appear in more than one film (Dr. No in 1962 and From Russia with Love in 1963). She was meant to be Bond's regular girlfriend, but was dropped after her appearance in the second film. After the series was rebooted, Moneypenny was re-introduced in Skyfall (2012) as an agent assisting Bond in his mission and her characterisation was closer to that of a Bond girl; following her demotion at the end of Skyfall the character returned for the next film, Spectre (2015), as M's personal assistant and the characterisation of Moneypenny was closer to that of the original series. Léa Seydoux, who played Madeleine Swann in Spectre, reprised her role in No Time to Die (2021).

In the Eon series, three actresses have made reappearances as different Bond girls: Martine Beswick and Nadja Regin both first appeared in From Russia with Love, and then appeared in Thunderball and Goldfinger respectively. Maud Adams played Andrea Anders in The Man with the Golden Gun (1974) and the eponymous character in Octopussy (1983).

If the non-Eon produced films, Casino Royale (1967) and Never Say Never Again (1983), are included, several other actresses have also been a Bond girl more than once: Ursula Andress in Dr. No (1962) and Casino Royale; Angela Scoular in On Her Majesty's Secret Service (1969) and Casino Royale; Valerie Leon in The Spy Who Loved Me (1977) and Never Say Never Again.

List of Bond girls

Ian Fleming stories

Mary Goodnight was a supporting character in several Bond novels before graduating to full Bond girl in The Man with the Golden Gun. Several short stories, such as "Quantum of Solace", "The Hildebrand Rarity", "The Living Daylights", and "The Property of a Lady", feature female characters in prominent roles, but none of these women interact with Bond in a romantic way.

Post-Fleming stories

Eon Productions films
There are several different archetypes for Bond girls: romantic interests, those who assist him, femme fatales (who invariably make an attempt on Bond's life), and sacrificial lambs (female allies or associates of Bond who wind up dead). Since it is debatable whether certain girls fulfil certain tropes (e.g. If Bond kisses a girl, does that make her a romantic interest? Is Pussy Galore a "femme fatale" due to her being in league with Goldfinger?), the following criteria are used for determining inclusion: women with whom sexual encounters are implied; the woman who principally assists Bond; femme fatales are taken to be women who attempt to kill Bond; sacrificial lambs are taken to be women with an allegiance to Bond whose death is instigated by the main villain or his henchmen.

Non-Eon films
In addition to the Eon Productions films, there have been two Bond films produced by independent studios and one television production. The roles are not as easily categorized.

Video games

Documentary
In 2002 former Bond girl Maryam d'Abo co-wrote the book Bond Girls Are Forever: The Women of James Bond. This book later became a DVD exclusive documentary featuring d'Abo and other Bond girls, including Ursula Andress. In some locations, the documentary was released as a gift with the purchase of Die Another Day on DVD. The featurette was included on the DVD release of Casino Royale (2006).

See also

 Outline of James Bond
 :Category:Bond girls

References

Bibliography
 
 
 

Lists of actors by role
Lists of fictional females
Lists of fictional sidekicks
Girl
 

de:Figuren aus James-Bond-Filmen#Die Bond-Girls